Teimuraz II (1680/1700–1762) of the Bagrationi dynasty, was a king of Kakheti, eastern Georgia, from 1732 to 1744, then of Kartli from 1744 until his death. Teimuraz was also a lyric poet.

Life 

He was a son of Erekle I and his wife Anna. Together with his mother, Teimuraz ruled as regent for his absent brother David II (Imam Quli-Khan) from 1709 to 1715. In 1732, the Turks killed the next king and Teimuraz’s other brother, Constantine, and took control of his kingdom. His successor, Teimuraz, fled to the mountains of Pshavi and fought the occupants from there. In July 1735, the resurgent Persian ruler Nader Shah Afshar invaded Kakheti and forced the Turks out of most of eastern Georgia. Nader summoned Teimuraz to his headquarters at Erivan and, upon his refusal to convert to Islam, had him detained. Kakheti was placed under the nominal government of Teimuraz's Muslim nephew Ali Mirza. In October 1735, Teimuraz escaped to the mountains of Kakheti and fomented unrest against the Persian rule, but he was captured by the close of 1736.

During these years, part of Georgian nobles staged a powerful rebellion against the Persian regime. In 1738, the shah had to release Teimuraz to counter the Georgian opposition, and made him governor of Kakheti, while his son Erekle II campaigned with Nader in India. The uprising now turned into a brutal civil war between pro- and anti-Persian factions. Teimuraz, aided by his son Erekle II, was able to crush the rebels led by Givi Amilakhvari. As a reward, the shah abolished, in 1742, a heavy tribute laid upon Kakheti, and helped Teimuraz to subdue autonomous duchies of the Aragvi and the Ksani in 1743 and 1744 respectively. For his service against the Ottomans and an anti-Persian revolt, in 1744, Teimuraz was confirmed by the shah as king of Kartli, and his son Erekle was given a Kakhetian crown, thus laying the ground for the eventual reunification of these Georgian kingdoms. Most importantly, they were recognised as Christian kings for the first time since 1632. Both monarchs were crowned at the Cathedral of the Living Pillar (Svetitskhoveli) at Mtskheta on October 1, 1745.

With their power growing increasingly stronger, Teimuraz and Erekle soon repudiated their allegiance to the Persian suzerain. Nader Shah ordered 30,000 Persian troops to move into Georgia and entrusted a Georgian convert (and a former anti-Persian leader) Amilakhvari with the punitive operation. The shah was, however, murdered in 1747, and his empire became engulf into complete chaos. The rulers of Kartli and Kakheti took advantage of the situation and expelled all Persian garrisons from their kingdoms. From 1749 to 1750, they checked several attempts of Persian pretenders to create their powerbase in the eastern Transcaucasia, and made the neighbouring khanates of Yerevan, Ganja, and Nakhichevan their tributaries. He fought then against the Dagestani clansmen who frequently raided the Georgian marchlands, but without complete success.

Like several previous Georgian rulers, he hoped that the expanding Russian empire would be the only protector for the Christians of Caucasus against the Ottoman and Persian aggressions. He sent an embassy to St Petersburg in 1752, but nothing came of this mission. In 1760, he visited the Russian court himself to gain a support for his project of a Georgian expedition to Persia to put a Russian candidate on the shah’s throne. The Russians were too preoccupied with the Seven Years' War to seriously consider Teimuraz’s idea. He died suddenly in the Russian capital on January 8, 1762 (just a fortnight after Elizabeth of Russia incidentally), and was buried next to his father-in-law Vakhtang VI in the Cathedral of the Assumption, Astrakhan. On his death, Erekle succeeded as king of Kartli, bringing both eastern Georgian kingdoms into a single state (Kingdom of Kartli and Kakheti)

Although he was constantly at war or on guard, Teimuraz found some time to translate from Persian and compose, virtually on horseback, his own poems and lyrics.

Reburial

In July 2013, Georgia raised the possibility to move Teimuraz's remains to Georgia for reburial.

Family 

Teimuraz married three times. He divorced his first wife, a daughter of Duke Baadur of the Aragvi, probably called Tamar, in 1711. Two years later, on February 2, 1712, he remarried Vakhtang VI's daughter Tamar (born 1696), who died on April 12, 1746. The same year, on August 19, Teimuraz married his third wife, Ana-Khanum (1716 — March 1788), daughter of Prince Bejan Palavankhosroshvili-Baratashvili, and former wife of Prince Kaikhosro Tsitsishvili. He had two sons and four daughters by his second and third marriages.

Teimuraz's children of his marriage to Tamar of Kartli were:

 Heraclius II (November 7, 1720 – January 11, 1798), the future king of Kakheti and of Kartli and Kakheti.
 Princess Ketevan, who married, in 1737 at Mashhad Adil Shah of Iran (1719–1749).
 Princess Elene (fl. 1743–1784), who married, c. 1743, Prince Zaza Tsitsishvili.
 Princess Ana  (1720 – December 4, 1788), who married firstly, in 1744, Prince Dimitri Orbeliani (died 1776) and secondly Prince Ioane Orbeliani (c. 1702 – 1781).

Teimuraz's union with Ana-Khanum Baratashvili produced:
 Prince Solomon (May 24, 1747 – July 28, 1749).
 Princess Elisabed (March 25, 1750 – May 8, 1770), who was betrothed to Prince Giorgi Amilakhvari in 1762, but the marriage was disrupted for political reasons in 1765 and Elisabed was given in marriage, on November 16, 1765, to Katsia II Dadiani, Prince of Mingrelia (died 1788).

References

Sources 
 
 
 Iranian-Georgian Relations in the 16th- 19th Centuries in Encyclopædia Iranica
Donald Rayfield, The Literature of Georgia: A History (August 16, 2000), Routledge, page 126-7 (about Teimuraz’s poetry)

Former Muslims from Georgia (country)
Converts to Eastern Orthodoxy from Shia Islam
Eastern Orthodox monarchs
Bagrationi dynasty of the Kingdom of Kakheti
18th-century poets from Georgia (country)
Afsharid governors of Kakheti
1680 births
1762 deaths
Male poets from Georgia (country)
Afsharid governors of Kartli
Kings of Kartli
Regents of Georgia